Christopher Hoag (born ) is a Canadian male volleyball player. He is the son of volleyball coach Glenn Hoag. He is part of the Canada men's national volleyball team. On club level he plays for Tevfik Filkret Altekma.

References

External links
 profile at FIVB.org

1988 births
Canadian men's volleyball players
Living people